The Umisachi Yamasachi is a two-car limited express train operated by JR Kyushu in Japan.

Overview

The train began operation on October 10, 2009, and is a 2-car limited express which runs to the resort town of Nichinan along the Nippō Main Line and the Nichinan Line. The consist is that of two converted KiHa 125-400 series cars; car 1, converted from KiHa 125-401 and named Yamasachi, contains 21 reserved seats, while car 2, converted from KiHa 125-402 and named Umisachi, contains 30 seats (9 free seats and 21 reserved seats). During initial operation, the entirety of car 2 was free seating. However, due to the large demand for reserved seats, this was changed later in 2009. The train also contains other sofa and chair seating not assigned to customers.

Features

Special music for the train is played on board. In addition, the train will slow near Aoshima to display the geologic feature known as the Ogre's Washboard. Attendants will also tell the story of Umisachi and Yamasachi, the namesakes of the train, as the legend takes place in southern Kyushu. 

Designed by Eiji Mitooka and Don Design and Associates, the train's theme is that of a "toy resort train made of wood" and is clad in obisugi cedar within and without. The refurbished train cars previously ran on Takachiho railway. The decor features motifs and traditional wooden toys from Miyazaki prefecture.

While the train is in normal operation, it is an excursion train and therefore operates mostly during weekends, holidays, and vacations. It makes one round trip per day. According to NHK World, as of July 2019, it is the tourist train in Kyushu boasting the highest ridership. 

The train runs along the longest straight-line conventional railway track in Kyushu. 

Car 1 contains an onboard sales counter.

Stops
The service calls at the following stations:

Miyazaki Station - Minami-Miyazaki Station - Tayoshi Station -  - Aoshima Station - Kitagō Station - Obi Station - Nichinan Station - Aburatsu Station - Nangō Station

As Nangō Station has no facilities for maintenance beside the main line, the train is sent back to Aburatsu until it is needed for the return journey.

See also
 List of named passenger trains of Japan
 Joyful Train, the generic name for excursion and charter trains in Japan

References

External links 

 

Kyushu Railway Company
Named passenger trains of Japan
Railway services introduced in 2009
2009 establishments in Japan